Dorysthenes is a genus of longhorn beetles of the subfamily Prioninae.

Species
The following species are recognised in the genus Dorysthenes:
 Dorysthenes angulicollis (Fairmaire, 1886) 
 Dorysthenes beli Lameere, 1911 
 Dorysthenes buqueti (Guérin-Méneville, 1844) 
 Dorysthenes davidis Fairmaire, 1886 
 Dorysthenes dentipes (Fairmaire, 1902) 
 Dorysthenes elegans Ohbayashi, 1981 
 Dorysthenes florentinii (Fairmaire, 1895) 
 Dorysthenes fossatus (Pascoe, 1857) 
 Dorysthenes gracilipes Lameere, 1915 
 Dorysthenes granulosus (Thomson, 1860) 
 Dorysthenes huegelii (Redtenbacher, 1848) 
 Dorysthenes hydropicus (Pascoe, 1857) 
 Dorysthenes igai Matsushita, 1941 
 Dorysthenes indicus (Hope, 1831) 
 Dorysthenes montanus (Guérin-Méneville, 1840) 
 Dorysthenes paradoxus (Faldermann, 1833) 
 Dorysthenes pertii (Hope, 1834) 
 Dorysthenes pici Lameere, 1912 
 Dorysthenes planicollis (Bates, 1878) 
 Dorysthenes rostratus (Fabricius, 1792) 
 Dorysthenes sternalis (Fairmaire, 1902) 
 Dorysthenes walkeri (Waterhouse, 1840) 
 Dorysthenes zivetta (Thomson, 1877)

References

Prioninae
Cerambycidae genera